Albert Lewis Kanter (April 11, 1897March 17, 1973) was the creator of Classics Illustrated and Classics Illustrated Junior. Kanter began creating Classic Comics with "The Three Musketeers" in October 1941. His renditions of classic novels in comic book form popularized classic tales for a younger audience.

Life and work

Early life
Kanter was born in Baranovitch, Russia and immigrated to the United States in 1904. He then lived in Nashua, New Hampshire, for some time. He left high school at the age of sixteen, and worked as a traveling salesman for years. He married Rose Ehrenrich in 1917 and moved to Savannah, Georgia. They had three children, named Henry (Hal), William, and Saralea.

Career
Kanter worked in real estate in Miami, but the Great Depression put an end to it, and Kanter moved his family to New York City. He worked for Colonial Press and then Elliot Publishing Company (which may have been an imprint of Malverne Herald). Elliot got into the comics market in 1941; one of their first titles was Double-Up Comics, which was made up of remaindered superhero comics from other publishers (like Harvey's Pocket Comics and Speed Comics).

Recognizing the appeal of early comics, Kanter believed he could use the burgeoning medium to introduce young and reluctant readers to "great literature". In October 1941, with the backing of two business partners, he created Classic Comics. The title became a huge success, proven by the demand for reprints of issues 1, 2, 3, and 5; something never seen before in the comic book industry. (Eventually, all 169 titles of Classic Comics were reprinted, some up to 25 times.) The comics' success opened classic novels to a large audience of young people for decades.

By the time of Classics Illustrated #4, in 1942, the title outgrew the space it shared with Elliot, and Kanter moved the operation to different offices, creating the corporate identity Gilberton Company, Inc. Classic Comics later became Classics Illustrated in March 1947, with the release of "The Last Days of Pompeii", the 35th issue.

In addition to Classics Illustrated, Kanter presided over its spin-offs Classics Illustrated Junior, Specials, and The World Around Us. Between 1941 and 1962, sales totaled 200 million.

The publication of new titles ceased in 1962 for various reasons. In 1967, Kanter sold his company to Twin Circle Publishing Co. and its conservative Catholic publisher Patrick Frawley, whose Frawley Corporation brought out two more titles but mainly concentrated on foreign sales and reprinting older titles. By the early 1970s, Classics Illustrated and Junior had been discontinued.

References

1897 births
1973 deaths
20th-century American businesspeople
Comic book company founders
Comic book publishers (people)
American magazine publishers (people)
Emigrants from the Russian Empire to the United States